USNS Yano (T-AKR-297) was originally constructed as the container ship Leise Maersk in 1980. In 1987, the ship was lengthened and again in the 1990s before it was purchased by the United States Navy. When the transfer was complete, the ship underwent a conversion to a large, medium-speed, roll-on/roll-off ship at NASSCO.

Military service
Yano entered service under Military Sealift Command in 1997, and was named after Medal of Honor recipient United States Army Sergeant First Class Rodney J. T. Yano. It has since served a role in basic military transport of material to bases around the world and served a vital role in the transport of material to both the Iraq and Afghanistan wars. Yano is operated by Patriot Contract Services, LLC under US Navy Military Sealift Command charter, and is manned by US Merchant Marine personnel.

The frigate suffered hull damage.

References

External links
 Unofficial Navy page for USNS Yano

Shughart-class cargo ships
Auxiliary ships of the United States
1980 ships
Ships built in Odense